Aesculus turbinata, common name Japanese horse-chestnut, is native to Japan but cultivated elsewhere. Flowers are white to pale yellowish with red spots. Capsules are dark brown, obovoid to pyriform. The seeds were traditionally eaten, after leaching, by the Jōmon people of Japan over about four millennia, until 300 AD. Today the seeds are used in Japanese cuisine to prepare "Tochimochi".

Etymology
Aesculus was named by Linnaeus, and the name is derived from the Roman name, aesculus, of the  durmast oak.

Turbinata means ‘conical’, ‘turbinate’, or ‘top-shaped’.

References

turbinata
Endemic flora of Japan
Trees of Japan